The Immediate Response Force (IRF) is a rapid deployment force jointly maintained by the United States Army and United States Air Force, which is capable of deploying worldwide within 18 hours of notification.

Background
By 1980, the United States formed the Rapid Deployment Joint Task Force (RDJTF) as a rapid reaction force under the  U.S. Readiness Command. Composed of contingently assigned units from the United States Army, United States Air Force, United States Navy, and United States Marine Corps, its mandate was to rapidly deploy to confront worldwide threats to American interests. With the passage of the 1986 Goldwater-Nichols Act, the relevance of a force with planet-wide responsibilities became less apparent and the RDJTF was deactivated.

In the 2000s, the Global Response Force (GRF) was created as a pooled reserve of CONUS-based military assets that could be used to rapidly reinforce one of the Unified Combatant Commands in the event of an emergent threat to American interests within a command's geographic area of responsibility. It was subsequently replaced with the Immediate Response Force.

Operational history
The IRF's first emergency deployment occurred in January 2020 and consisted of the 1st Brigade Combat Team, 82nd Airborne Division plus supporting Air Force assets. The deployment was to the Middle East and was in response to a prior attack on the U.S. embassy in Iraq. In June 2020, one infantry battalion of the IRF deployed to Fort Belvoir in response to riots in Washington, D.C. The unit remained on standby until dismissed by Secretary of Defense Mark Esper. The IRF's 1st Brigade Combat Team, 82nd Airborne Division was deployed to Afghanistan during Operation Allies Refuge in August 2021.

Elements of the 82nd Airborne, which makes up the core of the IRF, were mobilized and deployed to eastern Europe in support of NATO during the 2021–2022 Russo-Ukrainian crisis.

Structure
The IRF is built around a Brigade Combat Team of the 82nd Airborne Division. A rotating battalion of the brigade, along with Air Force Air Mobility Command assets, is kept at a high alert level to allow it to undertake an airborne deployment on 18 hours notice with no prior warning. This initial "entry force" of the IRF is designed to be followed by additional battalions within a period of days.

See also
 Joint Rapid Reaction Force (United Kingdom)
 Marine expeditionary unit
 Allied Rapid Reaction Corps (NATO)

References

 Cox, Matthew (January 2, 2020). "Emergency Paratrooper Deployment Is First for New Army Response Force". military.com. Retrieved January 5, 2020.

 "New Details About the 82nd Military Deployment to D.C." www.radio.com. 2020-06-11. Retrieved 2021-03-18.

 "82nd Airborne Division Immediate Response Force deploys to Afghanistan". Connecting Vets. August 13, 2021. Retrieved January 24, 2022.

 "'We're always ready' — Meet the soldiers of America's go-to rapid response force". Task & Purpose. January 27, 2022. Retrieved February 25, 2022.

 Blake, Sarah. "On short notice, US fast-response force flies to Mideast". Charlotte Observer. Associated Press. Retrieved January 5, 2020.

 McLaughlin, Elizabeth (January 3, 2020). "Pentagon to deploy roughly 3,500 more troops to Middle East with others placed on alert status, amid tensions with Iran". ABC News. Retrieved January 5, 2020.

United States Army
United States Air Force